Bzoummar (also spelled Bzommar or Bzemmar) is a village in the Keserwan District of the  Keserwan-Jbeil Governorate in Lebanon. Bzoummar's inhabitants are predominantly Maronite and Armenian Catholics. Bzoummar is home to a monastery of the Armenian Catholic Church that was built in 1749, where the image of Our Lady of Bzommar is venerated.

References

External links
Bzoummar, localiban

Populated places in Keserwan District
Armenian communities in Lebanon
Maronite Christian communities in Lebanon